The  St James Walkway is a -long subalpine tramping (i.e. the New Zealand term for 'hiking') track located in the Lewis Pass area of the South Island of New Zealand. It is administered by the Department of Conservation.

History
The St James Walkway was the first walking track in New Zealand to be built in a sub-alpine area.

Track description

The track starts near Lewis Pass and goes to Boyle Village and the Boyle River Outdoor Education Centre.

From there, the track follows the Ada River to the historic Christopher Cullers Hut, and the Christopher Hut.

Five of the huts are serviced, i.e. firewood or coal is provided, and 14 to 20 bunks are available: Cannibal Gorge,  Ada Pass, Christopher,  Anne and Boyle Flat huts. Christopher Cullers and Rokeby huts are basic huts with four and three bunks, respectively.

Part of St James Walkway passes through the former St James Station. More than half of the track is part of Te Araroa, which joins between Christopher and Anne Huts at the Waiau River.

Further reading

References

External links

 Department of Conservation – track information
 Department of Conservation – track information brochure
 St James Walkway hiking report including pictures and GPX of the trail

Hiking and tramping tracks in Canterbury, New Zealand